Narcissus Marsh (20 December 1638 – 2 November 1713) was an English clergyman who was successively Church of Ireland Bishop of Ferns and Leighlin, Archbishop of Cashel, Archbishop of Dublin and Archbishop of Armagh.

Marsh was born at Hannington, Wiltshire and was educated at Magdalen Hall, Oxford. He later became a fellow of Exeter College, Oxford, in 1658. In 1662 he was ordained, and presented to the living of Swindon, which he resigned in the following year.

After acting as chaplain to Seth Ward, Bishop of Exeter and then Bishop of Salisbury, and Lord Chancellor Clarendon, he was elected principal of St Alban Hall, Oxford, in 1673. In 1679 he was appointed Provost of Trinity College Dublin, where he did much to encourage the study of the Irish language. He helped to found the Dublin Philosophical Society, and contributed to it a paper entitled Introductory Essay to the Doctrine of Sounds (printed in Philosophical Transactions, No. 156, Oxford, 1684).

In 1683 he was consecrated Bishop of Ferns and Leighlin, but after the accession of James II he was compelled by the turbulent soldiery to flee to England (1689), when he became Vicar of Gresford, Flintshire, and Canon of St. Asaph. Returning to Ireland in 1691 after the Battle of the Boyne, he was made Archbishop of Cashel, and three years later he became Archbishop of Dublin. About this time he founded Marsh's Library in Dublin. Many oriental manuscripts belonging to him are now in the Bodleian Library in Oxford. He became Archbishop of Armagh in 1703. Between 1699 and 1711 he was six times a Lord Justice of Ireland. He died on 2 November 1713.

His funeral oration was pronounced by his successor at Dublin, Archbishop King. A more acerbic account is provided by Jonathan Swift.

References

Raymond Gillespie: Scholar Bishop:the recollections and diary of Narcissus Marsh, Cork University Press, 2003

1638 births
1713 deaths
Alumni of Magdalen Hall, Oxford
Anglican archbishops of Armagh
Anglican archbishops of Cashel
Anglican archbishops of Dublin
Bishops of Ferns and Leighlin
Burials at St Patrick's Cathedral, Dublin
Fellows of Exeter College, Oxford
Members of the Irish House of Lords
Members of the Privy Council of Ireland
Principals of St Alban Hall, Oxford
Provosts of Trinity College Dublin
17th-century Anglican archbishops
18th-century Anglican archbishops
Translators of the Bible into Irish
17th-century translators